The following lists events that happened during 1983 in Cambodia.

Incumbents 
 Monarch: Heng Samrin 
 Prime Minister: Chan Sy

Events

January

February

March

April

May

June

July

August

September

October

November

December

References

 
1980s in Cambodia
Years of the 20th century in Cambodia
Cambodia
Cambodia